Anarchism Today is a 1971 book on the connection between the 1960s New Left and classical anarchism. Edited by David E. Apter and James Joll, it was published by Macmillan Press in 1971.

Contents 
The book is split into 11 chapters, each written by a different author.

The Old Anarchism and the New — Some Comments 
The first chapter of the book, written by David E. Apter, is 13 pages long and contains general comments about anarchism, an overview of the main components of anarchism, and the role of theory in anarchism.

The Ideology and Practice of Contestation seen through Recent Events in France 
The second chapter of the book, written by Richard Gombin, is 20 pages long and talks about anarchist ideas in the 1968 French revolts, and the libertarian character of the methods used within them.

Anarchism and the American Counter-Culture 
The third chapter of the book, written by Michael Lerner, is 26 pages long. It describes the differences between the failed historical form of anarchism and the new manifestation of the anarchist idea, common in youth groups.

The Spanish Case 
The fourth chapter of the book, written by Joaquín Romero Maura, is 23 pages long, and details how Spain, a country ruled at the time by dictator Francisco Franco, had little to no anarchist presence. The restrictive right-wing regime prevented Spanish anarchists from organizing politically and prevented free political behavior from being exhibited or studied.

Anarchists in Britain Today 
The fifth chapter of the book, written by David Stafford, is 23 pages long. It opens with the observation that, though anarchism just five years earlier was a very niche and rare school of thought in Britain, it is now substantially more common.  The chapter then goes on to describe the 'anarchization' of the New Left.

References

Bibliography

External links 

 

1971 non-fiction books
Books about anarchism
English-language books
Macmillan Publishers books